Jeet Aulakh (born 18 December 1971 Punjab, India) is a Canadian Contemporary Artist and Poet.

Life 
He graduated from Panjab University with a BA in 1993.
He has lived and worked in Toronto and Windsor, Ontario since the late 1990s. Contained with spirituality and deep meditation, he emphasizes on what he calls "Pure Painting". Aulakh's work has been exhibited at major Canadian public galleries and museums, including the Art Gallery of Windsor and McIntosh Gallery London. His works are in public collections including the City of Toronto, University of Windsor and University of Western Ontario. He writes poetry mainly in Punjabi, his native language.

References

Sources 
 Patten, James; Salter, Mandy. "Anahada Naada" Exhibition Catalogue, Art Gallery of Windsor, McIntosh Gallery, 2010. 
 South Asian Ensemble, Vol 2 Number 3, PG 136
 Sanjh quarterly Punjabi magazine, Vol-1, April 2007, PG 86

External links 
 

1971 births
Living people
People from Punjab, India
Canadian people of Indian descent
Canadian contemporary painters
Artists from Toronto
Artists from Windsor, Ontario